Kojur District is a district (bakhsh) in Nowshahr County, Mazandaran Province, Iran. At the 2006 census, its population was 14,203, in 4,028 families.  The District has two cities Kojur and Pul.  The district has three rural districts (dehestan): Panjak-e Rastaq Rural District, Tavabe-e Kojur Rural District, and Zanus Rastaq Rural District.

References 

Nowshahr County
Districts of Mazandaran Province